William Stafford, 4th Earl of Stafford (21 September 1375 – 6 April 1395) was an English noble in the fourteenth century. He was the third son of Hugh Stafford, 2nd Earl of Stafford (c. 1344 – 16 October 1386); Hugh's second son Thomas inherited the earldom in 1390. He died in 1392, still childless, and the title passed to William.  He was still a minor, however, in the wardship of Thomas, Duke of Gloucester, his dead brother's father-in-law, and the Stafford estates were administered by a ' group of senior officials and lawyers.' He was still so when he died on 6 April 1395 in Pleshey, Essex of natural causes. He was interred in Tonbridge, Kent. William also dying childless, the Stafford earldom descended to the next brother, Edmund, who became the fifth earl.

References

External links
Inquisition Post Mortem, 1395.

1375 births
04
1395 deaths